PC-Talk is a communications software program. It was one of the first three widely popular software products sold via the marketing method that became known as shareware. It was written by Andrew Fluegelman in late 1982, and helped created shareware's sales and marketing methodology.

Fluegelman distributed PC-Talk by sending a copy to anyone who sent him a formatted floppy disk. The application encouraged users who liked it to send him $25, but doing so was not obligatory. Fluegelman also encouraged users to make copies for friends, and provided a batch file to do so. Though PC-Talk is regarded as a progenitor of the shareware distribution model, it was labeled at the time both freeware and "user-supported software", and included elements of open-source software (but not free software).

PC-Talk III was sold for $35 instead of being distributed for free; The Headlands Press offered a $25 discount to those who had previously donated. Its source code was available and many derivative works were created by its user community. The CompuServe IBM/PC SIG forum developed "PC-TALK III Version B, Level 850311". Both the user-modified version of the program and the CompuServe distribution point were officially sanctioned by Fluegelman and The Headlands Press, holders of the copyright for PC-TALK. Members of HAL-PC also produced custom versions that supported videotex and IBM 3101 emulation.

Reception
PC Magazine said that PC-Talk "is elegantly written and performs beautifully. It is easy to use and has all the features I would expect from a communications program".

References

Communication software
Shareware
Discontinued software